Kenneth Jon Barwise (June 29, 1942 – March 5, 2000) was an American mathematician, philosopher and logician who proposed some fundamental revisions to the way that logic is understood and used.

Education and career
Born in Independence, Missouri to Kenneth T. and Evelyn Barwise, Jon was a precocious child.

A pupil of Solomon Feferman at Stanford University, Barwise started his research in infinitary logic. After positions as assistant professor at Yale University and the University of Wisconsin, during which time his interests turned to natural language, he returned to Stanford in 1983 to direct the Center for the Study of Language and Information.  He began teaching at Indiana University in 1990. He was elected a Fellow of the American Academy of Arts and Sciences in 1999.

In his last year, Barwise was invited to give the 2000 Gödel Lecture; he died prior to the lecture.

Philosophical and logical work

Barwise contended that, by being explicit about the context in which a proposition is made, the situation, many problems in the application of logic can be eliminated. He sought ... to understand meaning and inference within a general theory of information, one that takes us outside the realm of sentences and relations between sentences of any language, natural or formal. In particular, he claimed that such an approach resolved the liar paradox. He made use of Peter Aczel's non-well-founded set theory in understanding "vicious circles" of reasoning.

Barwise, along with his former colleague at Stanford John Etchemendy, was the author of the popular logic textbook Language, Proof and Logic. Unlike the Handbook of Mathematical Logic, which was a survey of the state of the art of mathematical logic circa 1975, and of which he was the editor, this work targeted elementary logic.  The text is notable for including computer-aided homework problems, some of which provide visual representations of logical problems.  During his time at Stanford, he was also the first Director of the Symbolic Systems Program, an interdepartmental degree program focusing on the relationships between cognition, language, logic, and computation. The K. Jon Barwise Award for Distinguished Contributions to the Symbolic Systems Program has been given periodically since 2001.

Selected publications
Barwise, K. J. (1975) Admissible Sets and Structures. An Approach to Definability Theory 
Barwise, K. J. & Perry, John (1983) Situations and Attitudes. Cambridge: MIT Press. 
Barwise, K. J. & Etchemendy, J. (1987) The Liar: An Essay in Truth and Circularity 
Barwise, K. J. (1988) The Situation in Logic 
Barwise, K. J. & Moss, L. (1996) Vicious Circles. On the Mathematics of Non-Wellfounded Phenomena 
Barwise, K, J. & Seligman, J. (1997) Information Flow: the Logic of Distributed Systems 
Barwise, K. J. & Etchemendy, J. (2002) Language, Proof and Logic 
Barwise, K. J. Editor (1977) Handbook of Mathematical Logic. xi+1165 pages 
Barwise, J. & Feferman, S. Editors (1985) Model-Theoretic Logics. x+893 pages

See also
 Barwise Prize
 Barwise compactness theorem
 Slingshot argument

References

External links
In Memoriam: Kenneth Jon Barwise by Solomon Feferman The Bulletin of Symbolic Logic vol. 6(4) Dec. 2000, pp505–8 (PostScript)

1942 births
2000 deaths
20th-century American mathematicians
20th-century American non-fiction writers
20th-century American philosophers
20th-century essayists
American logicians
American male essayists
American male non-fiction writers
American philosophy academics
Deaths from colorectal cancer
Fellows of the American Academy of Arts and Sciences
Indiana University faculty
Mathematical logicians
Mathematicians from Missouri
Philosophers of logic
Philosophers of mathematics
Philosophy writers
Stanford University alumni
Stanford University Department of Philosophy faculty
University of Wisconsin–Madison faculty
Writers from Independence, Missouri
Yale University faculty
20th-century American male writers
Gödel Lecturers